Angelica arguta is a species of angelica known as Lyall's angelica. It is native to western North America, where it grows in coniferous forests from British Columbia to Utah. This is a taprooted perennial herb growing an erect, hollow stem to heights between one and two meters. It produces large, somewhat triangular leaves made up of many toothed, pointed leaflets each up to 9 centimeters long. The top of the stout stem is occupied by an inflorescence in a compound umbel arrangement, with the webbed rays of the umbel up to 10 centimeters long each. The flowers are generally yellowish.

The roots have been used medicinally for colds, sore throats or cramps. Beetles pollinate the flowers.

References

External links 
Jepson Manual Treatment
USDA Plants Profile
Photo gallery

arguta
Plants described in 1840
Flora of Washington (state)